KNFO (106.1 FM) is a radio station broadcasting a News Talk Information format. Licensed to Basalt, Colorado, United States, it serves the Aspen area.  The station is currently owned by Patricia MacDonald Garber and Peter Benedetti, through licensee AlwaysMountainTime, LLC. This News/Talk/Sports format covers every demographic segment you would like to reach, with frequencies in Aspen, Carbondale, Glenwood Springs and the Eagle Valley. KNFO is enjoyed by anyone looking for local and national information. The local show “Bach Talk”, has become one of the hottest shows in the area. Listeners are encouraged to call in and discuss local/national topics affecting the communities. Rush Limbaugh, Sean Hannity, Jim Rome and ESPN Sports are just a few of the nationally acclaimed syndicated shows the station carries. KNFO is also where sports fans tune in to catch the Denver Broncos, Colorado Avalanche, CU Buffs, Colorado Rockies, and Denver Nuggets.

External links
alwaysmountaintime.com website

NFO
CBS Sports Radio stations